Mountain Ranch Bike Park, located in Eagle Mountain, Utah, United States, is a city park designed for mountain bikers of all skill levels. The park features dirt jumps, a pump track, two slope style trails, a skills area and a single track trail with wood features.

Trails
The Juniper trail is a network of single track trails that winds through the juniper trees. The trail contains wood features for more advanced riders, and routes around the wood features for the less experienced rider.

The 110 trail is a slope style trail that features small jumps and banked turns. This is a great trail to learn on.

The 220 trail is a more advanced slope style trail which starts with a drop off of a ladder bridge. The trail has large banked turns, gap jumps, table tops, and double jumps.

External links
http://mountainranchbikepark.com/
http://www.casttv.com/video/ja6fm6/mountain-ranch-bike-park-6-27-09-video
http://www.bikerumor.com/2009/06/08/mountain-ranch-bike-park-opens-in-utah/
http://utahmtb.com/2009/06/23/mountain-ranch-bike-park-6-23-09/
http://www.ksl.com/index.php?nid=649&sid=6660837
http://www.deseretnews.com/article/1,5143,695259905,00.html

Parks in Utah
Mountain biking venues in the United States
Protected areas of Utah County, Utah